Quwat Salahaddin was an Iraqi football team based in Habbaniyah which competed in the Iraq Central FA League from the 1962–63 season until the 1972–73 season. They also competed in Iraq's first national football league in the 1973–74 season.

History
Quwat Salahaddin were founded as Al-Firqa Al-Thalitha and were originally based in Baqubah before moving to Habbaniyah. Al-Firqa Al-Thalitha won the Iraq Central FA League on one occasion in 1965–66 and also won the Iraq Central FA Perseverance Cup on two occasions in 1963 and 1966. In 1972, the team was renamed to Quwat Salahaddin.

In 1974, the Iraq Football Association decided to implement a clubs-only policy for domestic competitions, forming the Iraqi National Clubs First Division which was only open to clubs and not institute-representative teams such as Quwat Salahaddin. With the IFA dictating that only a single club would be allowed to represent the Army in the new top-flight, Al-Jaish Sports Club was established on 18 August 1974 by the Iraqi Olympic Committee, replacing Quwat Salahaddin, Quwat Al-Nasr and Al-Quwa Al-Bahriya in the top-flight.

Quwat Salahaddin participated in the 1974–75 Armed Forces League, after which most of the team's players joined Al-Jaish SC and the newly-formed Salahaddin SC.

Honours

Major
Iraq Central FA League
Winners (1): 1965–66
Runners-up (3): 1962–63, 1963–64, 1969–70
Iraq Central FA Second Division
Winners (1): 1961–62
Iraq Central FA Perseverance Cup
Winners (2): 1963, 1966
Runners-up (1): 1964

Minor
Army Cup
Winners (2): 1961, 1963
Quartet Cup
Winners (1): 1963

References

Defunct football clubs in Iraq